Eisteufel (Ice Devil) was a wolfpack of German U-boats that operated during the World War II Battle of the Atlantic from 21 June 1942 to 12 July 1942.

Service
The group was responsible for sinking 13 merchant ships totalling .

Raiding History

U-boats

References

Wolfpacks of 1942